Orlando Gonçalves (born 13 April 1938) is a Portuguese wrestler. He competed at the 1960 Summer Olympics and the 1972 Summer Olympics.

References

External links
 

1938 births
Living people
Portuguese male sport wrestlers
Olympic wrestlers of Portugal
Wrestlers at the 1960 Summer Olympics
Wrestlers at the 1972 Summer Olympics
People from Marinha Grande
Sportspeople from Leiria District